Haigerloch is a town in the north-western part of the Swabian Alb in Germany.

Geography

Geographical location
Haigerloch lies at between 430 and 550 metres elevation in the valley of the Eyach river, which forms two loops in a steep shelly limestone valley. The town is therefore also called the 'Felsenstädtchen' (rocky/cliffy small town).

Neighbouring municipalities

Haigerloch's neighbouring municipalities are specified below in clockwise order from the north, and belong to the Zollernalbkreis unless indicated.

Starzach ¹, Rangendingen, Grosselfingen, Balingen, Geislingen, Rosenfeld, Sulz am Neckar ², Empfingen ³ and  Horb am Neckar ³.
¹ Landkreis Tübingen, ² Landkreis Rottweil, ³ Landkreis Freudenstadt

Districts
Haigerloch consists of the following nine districts:

 Bad Imnau
 Bittelbronn
 Gruol
 Hart
 Haigerloch
 Owingen
 Stetten
 Trillfingen
 Weildorf
It is located 397 m above sea level. NN and has 572 inhabitants (31 December 2011). Bad Imnau was incorporated on 1 August 1973 town Haigerloch.

History
The city came in 1381 with the reign Haigerloch to the Habsburgs, the fief passed it in the 15th century to the lords of Weitingen. In 1516 Imnau was sold to the Count of Zollern. 
Imnau had inhabitants:
1824 440, 
1836 591  
1890 507

Mineral resources
In 1700, the physician Samuel Caspar discovered small pots source in the valley of the Eyach. 1733 Prince source was exposed, which is named after Prince Joseph Friedrich von Hohenzollern. 
In 1905, the Apollo-source was taken in by the family Imnau Pope, which was sold to Commerce Carl Haegele in the following year.

History

The first documented mention of Haigerloch was in the year 1095 on the occasion of the gift of the local castle. This castle was probably located in the area around the Upper Town. By 1200 the Counts of Hohenberg appear as the local lords and build a new castle on the Schlossberg. The  lower town evolved into a market town. Rudolf I, a brother-in-law of Albert II Von Hohenberg-Haigerloch, awarded the town charter to Haigerloch before 1231. In 1268 a battle was fought just outside the city between Zollern and Hohenberg. In 1291 the city was besieged by Count Eberhard I of Württemberg; in 1347 the town was besieged again. From 1356 onward the upper town and lower town were administratively separated, but were reunited when the lordship of Haigerloch was sold to Austria in 1381. The Habsburgs pawned the property on several occasions, including to the Counts of Württemberg.

In 1487 rule of the city fell to the Hohenzollern. In 1567 under Christoph von Hohenzollern-Haigerloch the area around Haigerloch was an independent territory within the area of the Holy Roman Empire as Hohenzollern-Haigerloch. In this period, the present castle complex was built on the Schlossberg as the residence of the counts of Hohenzollern-Haigerloch, replacing the former high-medieval structure. In 1634 rule of the city descended to the line of Hohenzollern-Sigmaringen, whose residence city was the city of Haigerloch between 1737 and 1769.

In the last months of World War II, Haigerloch was the location of the Kaiser Wilhelm Institute of Physics, part of the German nuclear programme, which had the goal of achieving practical use of nuclear fission. According to current view the atomic bomb was not a direct objective of this work, but initially only the construction of the Haigerloch Research Reactor (Forschungsreaktor Haigerloch), which was constructed in a beer cellar beneath the palace church.

Politics

Local council
In the local council election of 13 June 2004, the result was: 
 CDU - 15 seats 
 FWV - 9 seats 
 Social Ecologist List - 4 seats

Culture and objects of interest

Haigerloch lies on the Ferienstraße (holiday road) and on the Hohenzollernstraße.

Museums
  (atomic cellar museum), former research reactor during World War II 
 , former synagogue

Notable buildings
 Atomic cellar in the rock under the castle church 
 Roman tower  (Römerturm)
 Lower part of town church 
   
 Former synagogue

Partnerships between cities
  Noyal-sur-Vilaine, France
  Sokobanja, Serbia

Economics and infrastructure

Roads
The L410 connects the city with Rangendingen to the east. The L360 forms the feeder, along with the federal highway B463, to the A81 motorway.

Local industry
One of the few rock salt mines still active in Germany is in the Stetten quarter. Salt has been extracted here since 1854.

Notable people

 Salomon Schweigger (1551–1622), evangelic parson and traveller to the Orient
 Christoph, Count of Hohenzollern-Haigerloch (1552–1592), first Count of Hohenzollern-Haigerloch
 Johann Christoph, Count of Hohenzollern-Haigerloch (1586–1620), second Earl of Hohenzollern-Haigerloch
 Charles, Count of Hohenzollern-Haigerloch (1588–1634), third Earl of Hohenzollern-Haigerloch
 Franz Christoph Anton, Count of Hohenzollern-Sigmaringen (1699–1767), Canon, First Minister of the Electorate of Cologne
  (1718–1782), architect of the late Baroque
  (1807–1876), conductor, choirmaster and composer
 Father Desiderius Lenz, born Peter Lenz (1832–1928), painter and founder of the Beuron School of Art
  (1877–1944), born in Weildorf, politician (center), member of the Reichstag
  (1886–1931), writer
 Karl Hurm (1930–2019), painter

References

 This is a translation of the German wiki page :de:Haigerloch

External links

  

Nuclear program of Nazi Germany